The final of the Women's 100 metres Backstroke event at the European LC Championships 1997 was held on Thursday 21 August 1997 in Seville, Spain.

Finals

Qualifying heats

See also
1996 Women's Olympic Games 100m Backstroke
1997 Women's World Championships (SC) 100m Backstroke

References
 scmsom results
 La Gazzetta Archivio

B